AlFurat Media Center, or Furat Media Foundation is an Islamic State media organization established in January 2015. The AlFurat Media Center produces video, audio, and reading materials in multiple languages; Russian, Kazakh, Turkish, Kyrgyz, Tajik, and Indonesian, in addition to Arabic and English. In the summer of 2016, the AlFurat Media Center launched the "Al-Fatihin Magazine" in Indonesian. On January 17, 2016, AlFurat Media Center released the nasheed named.  On the 19th of September 2018, AlFurat released a English nasheed entitled "This is 'Ibadah".  On the 13th of May 2022, Furat Media Foundation would release a video on Telegram titled "A Message to the Infidel West".

References 

Islamic State of Iraq and the Levant mass media
Publishing companies established in 2015
Mass media companies established in 2015
English-language mass media
Indonesian-language mass media
Georgian-language mass media
Russian-language mass media
Arabic-language mass media
Kyrgyz-language mass media
Kazakh-language mass media
State media
Islamic media